Broadway Theatre (in Czech: Divadlo Broadway) is a theatre situated in Celetná street and Na Příkopě, Old Town, Prague, Czech Republic. It opened in 2002. It focuses on production of musicals.

Broadway Theatre is a part of the Palace Sevastopol, which was originally built in functionalist style in 1938. The Celetná and Na Příkopě streets are connected by Broadway Passage. The palace is listed in the register of protected buildings.

The theatre's first production was the musical Cleopatra, which made its début on 22 February 2002 and featured Bára Basiková, Ilona Csáková, Monika Absolonová and Radka Fišarová alternating in the title role.

References

External links 
  

Culture in Prague
Theatres in Prague
Music venues in Prague
2002 establishments in the Czech Republic
Theatres completed in 2002
Music venues completed in 2002
21st-century architecture in the Czech Republic